Trezzano sul Naviglio ( or simply  ) is a comune (municipality) in the Metropolitan City of Milan in the Italian region Lombardy, located about  southwest of Milan.

Trezzano sul Naviglio borders the municipalities of Buccinasco, Cusago, Cesano Boscone, Corsico, Gaggiano, Milan, and Zibido San Giacomo. It is served by Trezzano sul Naviglio railway station.

References

External links
 Official website

Cities and towns in Lombardy